Derek Jago (born 8 July 1942) is an Irish sailor. He competed in the Tempest event at the 1976 Summer Olympics.

References

External links
 

1942 births
Living people
Irish male sailors (sport)
Olympic sailors of Ireland
Sailors at the 1976 Summer Olympics – Tempest
Sportspeople from Cork (city)